Penicillium skrjabinii is a species of fungus in the genus  Penicillium which was isolated from soil near Blagoveshchensk in Amur Oblast in Siberia.

References 

skrjabinii
Fungi described in 1974